Saposoa Airport  is an airport serving the town of Saposoa in the San Martín Region of Peru.

On November 5, 1994, a Yakovlev Yak-40 trijet (registration OB-1569) belonging to Amazonic Air Services (Servicios Aéreos Amazónicos), a now-defunct regional airline, that was serving the Trujillo-Saposoa-Juanjuí-Tocache-Lima schedule, crashed into the aforementioned river after overrunning the airstrip during landing. The aircraft crashed due to heavy rain reported at the time. Of the 31 occupants (26 passengers and 5 crew) 5 passengers and 1 crewmen died.

See also
Transport in Peru
List of airports in Peru

References

External links
OpenStreetMap - Saposoa
OurAirports - Saposoa
SkyVector - Saposoa

Airports in Peru
Buildings and structures in San Martín Region